Charlie Norr (born July 1, 1944) is an American politician. He is a Democratic former member of the Missouri House of Representatives, having served from 2007 to 2011 and 2013 to 2017.

Electoral history

State Representative

State Senate

References

1944 births
21st-century American politicians
American firefighters
Living people
Democratic Party members of the Missouri House of Representatives
Politicians from Baltimore
Politicians from Springfield, Missouri